Alejandro Bernal Ríos (born 3 June 1988) is a Colombian footballer who plays for Atlético Bucaramanga. He usually plays as a defensive midfielder.

Honours

Club
Independiente Santa Fe
Copa Colombia (1): 2009

Atlético Nacional
Categoría Primera A (4): 2013-I, 2013-II, 2014-I, 2015-II
Copa Colombia (3): 2012, 2013, 2016
Superliga Colombiana (2): 2012, 2016
Copa Libertadores (1): 2016

References

External links

profile atlnacional.com.co

1988 births
Living people
Colombian footballers
Colombia under-20 international footballers
Categoría Primera A players
Deportivo Cali footballers
Independiente Santa Fe footballers
Atlético Nacional footballers
América de Cali footballers
Atlético Bucaramanga footballers
People from Montería
Association football midfielders